Hattusili II (Hittite: "from Hattusa") may have been a king of the Hittite Empire (New kingdom) ca. the early 14th century BC (short chronology).

His existence is disputed.  In the treaty between Muwatalli II and Talmi-Šarruma of Aleppo, reference is made to a ruler named Hattusili, but it is debated whether the reference is to an otherwise unknown Hittite ruler, or rather to Hattusili I.

See also

 History of the Hittites

Notes

External links
Discussion of Hattusili II

Hittite kings
14th-century BC rulers